Hisaharu (written: 久治) is a masculine Japanese given name. Notable people with the name include:

, Japanese water polo player
Hisaharu Satoh, Japanese bowls player
, Japanese judge

Japanese masculine given names